John Hazelton Cotteral (September 26, 1864 – April 22, 1933) was a United States circuit judge of the United States Court of Appeals for the Eighth Circuit and the United States Court of Appeals for the Tenth Circuit and previously was a United States district judge of the United States District Court for the Western District of Oklahoma.

A native of Indiana, Cotteral attended the University of Michigan, where he studied law, then read law until 1885. He moved to Kansas, where he entered a private legal practice. He then met A. C. G. Bierer, and the two formed a partnership. In 1889, they joined the 1889 Land Run into what was then named as Oklahoma Territory, and settled in the city of Guthrie, which had been named the territorial capital. Their partnership dissolved when President Grover Cleveland appointed Bierer to the Oklahoma Territory Supreme Court

Education and career

Born on September 26, 1864, in Middletown, Indiana, Cotteral attended the University of Michigan and read law in 1885. He entered private practice in Garden City, Kansas from 1885 to 1889, during which time he met and formed a partnership with A.C.G. Bierer, a native of Pennsylvania who had received a master's degree in law from Georgetown Law School in 1886, then moved to Garden City. Together, they decided to join the 1889 Land Run in the newly-created Oklahoma Territory, which had just opened the Cherokee Strip for settlement by white settlers. Their business continued as private practice in Guthrie, Indian Territory (Oklahoma Territory from May 2, 1890, State of Oklahoma from November 16, 1907) starting in 1889.

Federal judicial service in Oklahoma
The Bierer-Cotteral partnership effectively ended when President Grover Cleveland named Bierer as an Associate Justice on the Oklahoma Territory Supreme Court in 1896.
Cotteral received a recess appointment from President Theodore Roosevelt on November 11, 1907, to the United States District Court for the Western District of Oklahoma, a new seat authorized by 34 Stat. 267. He was nominated to the same position by President Roosevelt on December 3, 1907.  He was confirmed by the United States Senate on January 13, 1908, and received his commission the same day. His service terminated on May 23, 1928, due to his elevation to the Eighth Circuit.

Cotteral was nominated by President Calvin Coolidge on May 19, 1928, to a seat on the United States Court of Appeals for the Eighth Circuit vacated by Judge Walter Henry Sanborn. He was confirmed by the Senate on May 23, 1928, and received his commission the same day. Cotteral was reassigned by operation of law to the United States Court of Appeals for the Tenth Circuit on March 28, 1929, to a new seat authorized by 45 Stat. 1346. His service terminated when he died on April 22, 1933.

Notes

References

External links
 

1864 births
1933 deaths
Judges of the United States District Court for the Western District of Oklahoma
United States district court judges appointed by Theodore Roosevelt
Judges of the United States Court of Appeals for the Eighth Circuit
Judges of the United States Court of Appeals for the Tenth Circuit
United States court of appeals judges appointed by Calvin Coolidge
20th-century American judges
University of Michigan Law School alumni
People from Henry County, Indiana
United States federal judges admitted to the practice of law by reading law
People from Garden City, Kansas
People from Guthrie, Oklahoma